In 1997, Moni Naor and Omer Reingold described efficient constructions for various cryptographic primitives in private key as well as public-key cryptography. Their result is the construction of an efficient pseudorandom function. Let p and l be prime numbers with l |p−1. Select an element g ∈  of multiplicative order l. Then for each (n+1)-dimensional vector a = (a0,a1, ..., an)∈  they define the function

where x = x1 … xn is the bit representation of integer x, 0 ≤ x ≤ 2n−1, with some extra leading zeros if necessary.

Example

Let p = 7 and l = 3; so l |p−1. Select g = 4 ∈  of multiplicative order 3 (since 43 = 64 ≡ 1 mod 7).  For n = 3, a = (1, 1, 2, 1) and x = 5 (the bit representation of 5 is 101), we can compute  as follows:

Efficiency
The evaluation of function  in the Naor–Reingold construction can be done very efficiently. Computing the value of the function  at any given point is comparable with one modular exponentiation and  n-modular multiplications. This function can be computed in parallel by threshold circuits of bounded depth and polynomial size.

The Naor–Reingold function can be used as the basis of many cryptographic  schemes including symmetric encryption, authentication and digital signatures.

Security of the function

Assume that an attacker sees several outputs of the function, e.g. , ...  and wants to compute . In general, moving from k to k + 1 changes the bit pattern and unless k + 1 is a power of 2 one can split the exponent in  so that the computation corresponds to computing the Diffie–Hellman key between two of the earlier results. This attacker wants to predict the next sequence element. Such an attack would be very bad—but it's also possible to fight it off by working in groups with a hard Diffie–Hellman problem (DHP).

Example:
An attacker sees several outputs of the function e.g. Then, the attacker wants to predict the next sequence element of this function, .

There are other attacks that would be very bad for a pseudorandom number generator: the user expects to get random numbers from the output, so of course the stream should not be predictable, but even more, it should be indistinguishable from a random string. Let  denote the algorithm   with access to an oracle for evaluating the function  .

   is negligible.

Linear complexity

One natural measure of how useful a sequence may be for cryptographic purposes is the size of its linear complexity. The linear complexity of an n-element sequence W(x), x = 0,1,2,…,n – 1, over a ring  is the length l of the shortest linear recurrence relation W(x + l) = Al−1 W(x +l−1) + … + A0 W(x),  x = 0,1,2,…, n – l −1 with A0, …, Al−1 ∈ , which is satisfied by this sequence.

For some  > 0,n ≥ (1+ ) , for any , sufficiently large l, the linear complexity of the sequence ,0 ≤ x ≤ 2n-1, denoted by  satisfies

for all except possibly at most  vectors a ∈ .  The bound of this work has disadvantages, namely it does not apply to the very interesting case

Uniformity of distribution

Let  be the discrepancy of the set . Thus, if  is the bit length of p then for all vectors a ∈  the bound  holds, where

 
and 

Although this property does not seem to have any immediate cryptographic implications, the inverse fact, namely non uniform distribution, if true would have disastrous consequences for applications of this function.

Sequences in elliptic curve

The elliptic curve version of this function is of interest as well. In particular, it may help to improve the cryptographic security of the corresponding system.

where   is the bit representation of integer . 
The Naor–Reingold elliptic curve sequence is defined as 
 
 
If the decisional Diffie–Hellman assumption holds, the index k is not enough to compute  in polynomial time, even if an attacker performs polynomially many queries to a random oracle.

See also
Decisional Diffie–Hellman assumption
Finite field
Inversive congruential generator
Generalized inversive congruential pseudorandom numbers

Notes

References
.

Pseudorandom number generators
Cryptography